KHHS (104.5 FM) is a radio station licensed to Pearcy, Arkansas. The station broadcasts a Christian radio format and is owned by Houston Christian Broadcasters.

History
On December 7, 2016, KLBL was sold from US Stations, LLC to Central Arkansas Radio Group, LLC and changed their format from classic country branded as "104.5 The Bull" to classic hits.  "The Bull" branding was moved to 101.5 Malvern and became known as "101.5 The Bull".

On December 14, 2016, KLBL changed their call letters to KHTO.

On February 24, 2017, KHTO changed their format from classic hits to a simulcast of KHCB-FM 105.7 Houston, Texas, as a result of a sale from Central Arkansas Radio Group, LLC to Houston Christian Broadcasters.

On March 7, 2017, KHTO changed their call letters to KHHS.

References

External links

Radio stations established in 1992
1992 establishments in Arkansas
HHS (FM)